KQPN (730 kHz) is a commercial AM radio station licensed to West Memphis, Arkansas, and serving the Memphis metropolitan area.  It is owned by F.W. Robbert Broadcasting.  The station is branded as "Memphis' Sports Station," and is commonly referred to as 'SportsMap Radio 730'.  Much of its programming comes from the SportsMap Sports Network.  KQPN is also Memphis' home for Mississippi State University Bulldogs athletics.

KQPN broadcasts at 1,000 watts.  Because AM 730 is a Canadian and Mexican clear channel frequency, KQPN uses a directional antenna at all times to avoid interfering with other stations.  The transmitter is off Gammon Road in Marion, Arkansas.

History
The station signed on the air on December 1, 1961, as KSUD.  It played Top 40 hits.  By 1963, the music was a mix of folk, country, and Southern gospel music.  It later switched formats to include Christian radio programming and Contemporary Christian music.

In May 2005, KSUD flipped to all-sports, becoming an ESPN Radio Network affiliate.  It changed its call sign to KQPN later that year. On August 4, 2008, ESPN programming moved to 680 WSMB from KQPN, and KQPN took over the Fox Sports programming from WSMB the next day.

KQPN became affiliated with Yahoo! Sports Radio on December 5, 2011, after Entercom-owned 790 WMC took Fox Sports Radio away from KQPN beginning on October 17, 2011.  In 2016, Yahoo! Sports Radio switched its name to SB Nation Radio.

References

External links
Schedule page

QPN
Sports radio stations in the United States
Radio stations established in 1962